TITO may refer to:

 Ticket-In, Ticket-Out, a type of cashless slot machine
 Thug in Thug Out, an album by Young Noble and Hussein Fatal

See also
 Tito